"Like a Robot"  is the third and final single from Danish-Norwegian pop band Aqua's third studio album, Megalomania.  It was their first single to come with an "explicit language" warning, with band member René Dif playing it down, saying: "There’s a million rappers out there who do that too."

Background
On 12 September 2011, Aqua released two singles, "Playmate to Jesus" and "Like a Robot". While "Playmate to Jesus" impacted radios, "Like A Robot" was  serviced as a 'club' single.

On November 5, 2011 producer Lucas Secon reported that "Like a Robot" would be released as the album's international lead single. "Like a Robot" was released in January 2012 in Australia and New Zealand.

Reception
Scandipop reviewed the song as; "Amazing, Amazing, Amazing" They added, "...it’s them returning to the clubland from which they came. Squeaky voiced Lene laments a man’s shortcomings in the bedroom department" 

Luis Gonzalez of Album Confessions said; “Like A Robot”, a raunchy song that ultimately deals with sex and alcohol. Aqua has forgotten all the past metaphors and innuendos and have decided to be up front with their naughty message. The production is great; the lyrics are fun and get lodged in your brain easily especially the golden chorus.

Jon O'Brien of Allmusic, in a review of Megalomania, said; ""Like a Robot" shows that the band's tongue-in-cheek innuendos have disappointingly been replaced by straightforward explicitness". "

Gaffa's Signe Bønsvig Wehding considered the song to be "among the best tracks on the album", along with "Playmate To Jesus", "Dirty Little Pop Song" and "Sucker For A Superstar"".

The Border Mail gave the album a negative review, but complimented "Like A Robot" for being 'punchy'.

Track listing
Digital download
 "Like a Robot" – 3:39

Credits
 Written by Lucas Secon, René Dif, Søren Rasted and Claus Norreen
 Produced by Lucas Secon, Søren Rasted and Claus Norreen
Credits adapted from album liner notes.

Release history

Dates in Australian/New Zealand iTunes have reverted to Scandinavian release date.

References

2011 singles
Aqua (band) songs
Songs written by Claus Norreen
Songs written by Søren Rasted
Songs written by Lucas Secon
Songs written by René Dif
Techno songs